Central Visual and Performing Arts High School (formerly Central High School) is a magnet high school in St. Louis, Missouri, part of the St. Louis Public Schools.

Founded in 1853, Central High School is the oldest public high school west of the Mississippi River, although it has moved several times and merged with a magnet school in 1984. Central VPA specializes in the arts, with students taking courses in three art majors, including visual art, musical art, and performing art, with focuses on ceramics, drawing and painting, photography, instrumental music, vocal music, dance, and theater.

History

Establishment and early moves: 1853–1893

In late 1852, the Board of Education of the St. Louis Public Schools ordered the organization and opening of a high school to serve the city population. The Board located the school within Benton School, a primary school then located on 6th Street between St. Charles and Locust streets, and on February 7, 1853, 70 students were admitted after an entrance examination. Its first principal was Jeremiah D. Low. Soon after its opening, the Board ordered construction on a dedicated building for the high school, then known simply as St. Louis High School.

Designed by William Rumbold, the new building was built in 1855 at a cost of $50,000 at the corner of Olive and 15th streets. The building had three full stories and a basement, nine classrooms, a 700-seat auditorium, and 16 smaller rooms used as libraries and wardrobes. It initially was built with a capacity of slightly less than 500 students. By 1859, course requirements for entrance had been developed, and two courses of study (general or classical) were available to students.

The high school remained the only public high school in the community until the establishment of Sumner High School for black students in 1874. By the early 1890s, the Central High School building at 15th and Olive had deteriorated and become too small for the number of students attempting to enroll.

New building and the tornado: 1893–1927

The new Central High School building opened on September 1, 1893; designed by Furlong and Brown in the Victorian style, the facility cost $365,000, while land acquisition costs were $34,000. The building featured four stories, a curved facade, and a tower housing the school stairwells, and it had a capacity of 1,200 students. A notable event in Central's history occurred when, in 1922, William J. S. Bryan retired after having taught for 50 years in the school. During this period, several other high schools opened in St. Louis to alleviate overcrowding at Central, including McKinley High School and Yeatman High School in 1904, followed by Soldan High School in 1909, Cleveland High School in 1915, Roosevelt High School in 1925 and Beaumont High School in 1926.

On September 27, 1927, a tornado struck St. Louis, including Central High School, killing 76 people and leaving 1,500 others injured in total. The tornado killed five students—they are listed in the 1928 Central yearbook on a page with a touching poem--- and more than a dozen were injured when the school's tower collapsed. The damage to the building was so great that the school was permanently relocated to nearby Yeatman High School, which was renamed Central High School. The building, located on Garrison Avenue, had been designed by William B. Ittner as a three-story all-brick building with two towers at its entrance, and it would continue to house Central students through 2004.  It has long been forgotten that the Central student body and faculty had just returned to the Grand Avenue building FROM Yeatman High School, where the school had been housed two years while the Grand Avenue building underwent an extensive renovation and updating.  School had just gotten underway back at the Central building when the tornado struck.  Everyone and everything had to be moved back to Yeatman.  It's also been long forgotten that one wall of the school eventually built on the Central site, the factory-like and uniquely conceived Hadley Vocational High School, was a wall preserved from the Central building.

Integration, magnet school status, and merger: 1927–1984

Central students continued their traditions at their new building on Garrison Avenue, including the use of the letter "H" to signify the school's status as the first high school west of the Mississippi. During the 1930s, enrollment in the St. Louis Public Schools increased and achieved a peak of 106,300 students; several high schools in the district reported overcrowding, and Central was no exception. In the 1931–1932 school year, enrollment at Central stood at slightly more than 1,500 students. Two years later, during the 1934–1935 school year, the enrollment at Central had grown to nearly 1,700 students. It was during the early 1950s at Central that the school's baseball team won three consecutive state championships, led by Vern Bradburn as head coach.

In January 1955, Central began accepting black students for the first time under a plan adopted the previous year by the Board of Education in response to the Brown v. Board of Education decision. Despite the Board of Education's claim that integration was accomplished smoothly district-wide, in December 1957 more than 50 white students stayed out of school in protest due to a dispute between a white and black student, leading to the dispatch of a dozen police officers to disperse the crowd. According to the principal of Central, the two students had argued over ownership of a sweater, and the white student was assaulted. Despite the protest outside, most of the school's 1,300 students remained in class; two students who refused police orders to disperse were arrested but later released.

Despite de jure integration, the St. Louis Public Schools kept no official records on the race of students from 1954 to 1963 in an effort to maintain a "color blind" policy. As part of this policy, the district took steps to ensure that black students remained in black schools or in self-contained classrooms and playgrounds at white schools, and throughout the 1960s, Central had a predominantly white population. As white families moved out of Central's zone during the early 1970s, violence broke out between remaining white students and increasing numbers of black students. In March 1979, Jesse Jackson visited the school to ameliorate tensions, and by 1980, the school's population was 95 percent black.

During the 1970s, the St. Louis Public Schools implemented magnet schools; as part of this process, in 1976 the district opened Visual and Performing Arts High School (VPA) as a small learning community magnet school within the O'Fallon Technical High School building on McRee Avenue. VPA moved to the Humboldt School building on 9th Street during the late 1970s, and in 1984, VPA moved again when it merged with Central High School; the combined school, Central VPA, continued to operate at Central's Garrison Avenue location.

Recent history and moves: 1984–present
In early 1988, plans were announced to close the Central VPA building on Garrison Avenue for renovations and transfer its students to McKinley High School for one year. About 800 Central VPA students joined approximately 120 McKinley mass media magnet school students at the McKinley building, while 330 non-magnet students at McKinley were transferred to other comprehensive schools in the district. The renovations at Central VPA, planned to cost $6 million, were part of a $114 million district capital improvement plan. Renovations to the Garrison Avenue building eventually exceeded $7.5 million, although they were completed in time for the 1989–1990 school year.

Among the improvements to the school was a full renovation of the theater, which included removal of the structurally unsafe balcony, installation of acoustical panels, and construction of a light and sound booth in the rear of the auditorium. In addition, the renovations included a new foyer for the theater, a new fire alarm and sprinkler system, new aluminum windows, a new art studio on the building roof, a library expansion, and updates to science laboratories. After the renovations were completed, Central VPA students returned for the 1989–1990 school year.

Upon the reopening of the Garrison Avenue building, the Anheuser-Busch company donated an aluminum statue of William Shakespeare to the school. The school also won praise as an example of the success of the magnet school program by the U.S. District Court judge overseeing the desegregation case that created magnet schools in St. Louis:

Despite the renovations of 1988–1989, within a decade the school building again was in need of significant repairs. During the late 1990s, several ceilings in the building had collapsed due to roof leaks, while the building suffered from a rodent and insect infestation. By 2002, the building's roof leaked into the music wing and windows were stuck open in the auditorium leading to interior problems. Supplies and money for extra rehearsals also were in short supply, and teachers complained that both the cafeteria and the theater seated only half of the 500 students at the school. The principal of the school, John Niemeyer, noted that budget cuts and paperwork problems were to blame for many issues and argued that the building was not suited for a performing arts school.

As a result of deteriorating conditions at Central VPA, the St. Louis Board of Education heard several proposals on moving Central VPA to another building. Among the options considered at a meeting in November 2002 was to renovate the Kiel Opera House as an academic facility and performing arts venue; although the proposal to move to Kiel was not adopted, the Board committed to replacing the high school's building in the near term. In the summer of 2004, the Board announced that Central VPA would move into the former Southwest High School building at the corner of Kingshighway and Arsenal. , the Garrison Avenue building, home to Yeatman High School from 1904 to 1927 and to Central from 1927 to 2004, is for sale for $250,000.

In December 2008 as part of a promotional tour, actor Will Smith visited students at Central VPA and viewed them conducting a dance routine to one of his songs. As of the 2010–2011 school year, Central VPA began no longer offering programs in television or radio. In addition, Central discontinued its sports program in order to use the money to help fund the remaining arts programs.

On October 17, 2012, the Garrison Avenue building was added to the National Register of Historic Places.

On October 24, 2022, a 19-year-old former student shot and killed two people in a mass shooting at the institution, before being killed in a shootout with responding police officers.

Current status
As of the 2015–2016 school year, Central VPA operates on a 7:20 am to 2:27 pm schedule.

Activities
For the 2011–2012 school year, the school offered only two activities approved by the Missouri State High School Activities Association (MSHSAA): band, orchestra and vocal music, and speech and debate; the school does not sponsor athletic teams. In addition to its current activities, its students have won three state championships:
Baseball: 1950, 1951, 1952
The school also has produced four singles tennis state champions and three individual wrestling champions.

Demographics

Academic and discipline issues
Central VPA has a higher graduation rate of 87.7 for 2010–2011, higher than the state average of 79.8. Central VPA also has a discipline incident rate of 3.3 percent. Since the passage of No Child Left Behind in 2001, Central VPA met the requirements for adequate yearly progress (AYP) in communication arts in 2006 and 2011; it met AYP in mathematics in 2011. In addition, more than 80 percent of Central VPA graduates enrolled in a public university in Missouri required remedial coursework in either English or mathematics.

Notable people

Faculty
Helen Almira Shafer: Later president of Wellesley College

Alumni
Ray Armstead: Olympic gold medalist runner
Hettie Barnhill: Dancer and choreographer
Frank Baumann: Major League Baseball player
Freeman Bosley, Jr.: 43rd Mayor of St. Louis
Al Caldwell: R&B musician and producer
Richard Fortus: Guitarist with Guns N' Roses
Nathan Frank: Member of the United States House of Representatives
Walker Hancock: Sculptor and winner of the Medal of Freedom and National Medal of Arts
Fannie Hurst: Author
Fred Koenig: Major League Baseball player, manager, coach
Frederick Kreismann: 31st Mayor of St. Louis
Breckinridge Long: U.S. Ambassador to Italy
Julius B. Maller (1901–1959), educator and sociologist
Agnes Moorehead: Film actress, winner of the Golden Globe Award and Emmy Award
Ben Moreell: U.S. Navy admiral, founder of the Seabees
Sam Muchnick: Professional wrestling promoter
Charles Nagel: Founder of the United States Chamber of Commerce and Secretary of Commerce and Labor
David Merrick: Tony Award-winning Broadway producer
Edgar Monsanto Queeny: Industrialist and chairman of Monsanto
Siegfried Reinhardt: Painter and stained glass artist
Larry Whisenton: Major League Baseball player
Ryan Koenig: Musician, recording artist, songwriter, and producer
Angela Walton Mosley: MO State Senator, District 13

References

External links

Partial alumni listings for Central High School
Photographs of Central High School building on Garrison Avenue

High schools in St. Louis
Magnet schools in St. Louis
Educational institutions established in 1853
Public high schools in Missouri
1853 establishments in Missouri
Buildings and structures in St. Louis